Centerpoint Medical Center is a hospital located in Independence, Missouri at 19600 East 39th Street. It is part of the HCA Midwest Division.

Hospital Background
Centerpoint opened in May 2007 and is the newest hospital in eastern Jackson County. It replaces Medical Center of Independence and Independence Regional Health Center in a new location. The hospital is at 39th & Little Blue Parkway just off of I-70 and east of the Independence Center. Its campus includes the medical center itself and a medical office building/outpatient services center connected to the hospital on the west side of the hospital.

References
 Centerpoint Medical Center Official Website

Hospitals in Missouri
Buildings and structures in Independence, Missouri
HCA Healthcare
Hospitals established in 2007
2007 establishments in Missouri